German submarine U-1109 was a Type VIIC/41 U-boat of Nazi Germany's Kriegsmarine during World War II.

She was ordered on 2 April 1942, and was laid down on 20 October 1943, at Nordseewerke, Emden, as yard number 231. She was launched on 19 June 1944, and commissioned under the command of Oberleutnant zur See Hans Julius Hoß on 31 August 1944.

Design
German Type VIIC/41 submarines were preceded by the heavier Type VIIC submarines. U-1109 had a displacement of  when at the surface and  while submerged. She had two shafts and two  propellers.

U-1109 was fitted with five  torpedo tubes (four fitted at the bow and one at the stern), fourteen torpedoes or 26 TMA or TMB Naval mines, one  SK C/35 naval gun, (220 rounds), one  Flak M42 and two  C/30 anti-aircraft guns. The boat had a complement of between forty-four and fifty-two.

Service history
U-1109 participated in two war patrols. Her first patrol was cut short, having left Kristiansand on 22 March 1945, she arrived in Bergen, 6 April 1945, having experienced technical problems on 2 April 1945. She did not damage or sink any enemy vessels. U-1109s second patrol also resulted in no ships sunk or damaged, departing Bergen on 17 April 1945.

On 12 May 1945, U-1109 surrendered at Loch Eriboll, Scotland. She was later transferred to Lisahally on 31 May 1945. Of the 156 U-boats that eventually surrendered to the Allied forces at the end of the war, U-1109 was one of 116 selected to take part in Operation Deadlight. U-1109 was towed out and sank on 6 January 1946, by torpedoes from the British submarine .

See also
 Battle of the Atlantic

References

Bibliography

External links

German Type VIIC/41 submarines
U-boats commissioned in 1944
World War II submarines of Germany
1944 ships
Ships built in Emden
Maritime incidents in 1946
World War II shipwrecks in the Atlantic Ocean
Operation Deadlight
U-boats sunk by British submarines